Aquametry in analytical chemistry refer to analytical processes to measure the water present in materials.

The methods widely used in aquametry encompasses Karl Fischer titration, distillation, chromatography etc.

Sources 
McGraw-Hill Dictionary of Scientific & Technical Terms (6. ed.). The McGraw-Hill Companies, Inc. 2003.  (online May 6, 2011)

References

Analytical chemistry